Events in 1918 in animation.

Films released
Unknown date – Sin dejar rastros  (Argentina)
February – Urashima Tarō (Japan)
25 February – The Pinkerton Pup's Portrait (United States)
18 May – The Sinking of the Lusitania (United States)

Births

January
 January 4: Buddy Baker American composer (The Many Adventures of Winnie the Pooh, Bon Voyage, Charlie Brown (and Don't Come Back!), The Fox and the Hound, The Puppetoon Movie), (d. 2002).
 January 26: Vito Scotti, American actor (voice of Peppo in The Aristocats), (d. 1996).

February
 February 13: Al Pabian, American animator (Chuck Jones, Peanuts specials), (d. 2015).
 February 14: William L. Snyder, American film producer (Rembrandt Films), (d. 1998).
 February 16: Patty Andrews, American singer (co-sang the Johnny Fedora and Alice Blue Bonnet segment in Make Mine Music, and Little Toot in Melody Time), (d. 2013).
 February 22: Don Pardo, American announcer (voice of the Announcer in Totally Minnie, himself in The Simpsons episodes "Moe Letter Blues" and "Moonshine River"), (d. 2014).

March
 March 2: 
 Bob Givens, American animator, character designer and lay-out artist (Walt Disney Company, Warner Bros. Cartoons, Hanna-Barbera, DePatie-Freleng Enterprises), (d. 2017).
 Michael Rye, American actor (voice of the title character in The Lone Ranger, Apache Chief and Green Lantern in Super Friends, Duke Igthorn, King Gregor, and Sir Gawain in Adventures of the Gummi Bears, J.J. Wagstaff in Fluppy Dogs, Mr. Slaghoople in The Flintstone Kids, Farley Stillwell in Spider-Man), (d. 2012).
 March 3: Dave Monahan, American screenwriter (Warner Bros. Cartoons), (d. 2003).
 March 6: Harold Mack, English animator and comics artist (worked for Gaumont British Animation, British Animated Pictures and Marten Toonder's animation studio, established his own animation studio The Anglo-Dutch Group), (d. 1975).
 March 9: Vance Colvig, American clown and actor (voice of Chopper in The Yogi Bear Show), (d. 1991).
 March 18: Mike Road, American actor (voice of Race Bannon in Jonny Quest, Zandor in The Herculoids, Ugh in Space Ghost and Dino Boy), (d. 2013).
 March 19: Marvin Mirisch, American film producer and brother of Walter Mirisch (The Pink Panther), (d. 2002).
 March 29: Pearl Bailey, American actress and singer (voice of Mrs. Elephant in Tubby the Tuba, Big Mama in The Fox and the Hound), (d. 1990).

April
 April 4: Gerry Johnson, American actress (voice of Betty Rubble in the final two seasons of The Flintstones), (d. 1990).
 April 18: Dick Sutcliffe, American animator (co-creator of Davey and Goliath), (d. 2008).
 April 19: William Arthur Smith, American animation writer, comics artist and illustrator (worked for Walter Lantz), (d. 1989).
 April 25: Tom Daly, Canadian film producer (My Financial Career), (d. 2011).

July
 July 2: Wim Boost, aka Wibo, Dutch comics artist, cartoonist and animator, (d. 2006).
 July 6: Sebastian Cabot, English actor (voice of the narrator and Sir Ector in The Sword in the Stone, Bagheera in The Jungle Book, narrator in The Many Adventures of Winnie the Pooh), (d. 1977).

August
 August 17: Mort Marshall, American actor (voice of Stanley Livingstone, Rocky Maninoff and other various characters in Tennessee Tuxedo and His Tales, Klondike Kat in The Beagles, original voice of the Trix Rabbit), (d. 1979).
 August 19: Floyd Huddleston, American songwriter (The Aristocats, Robin Hood), (d. 1991).
 August 26: Dave Barry, American radio host and actor (voice of Humphrey Bogart in 8 Ball Bunny, voice of Bluto in the Popeye cartoon Seein' Red, White 'N' Blue, voice of Elmer Fudd in Pre-Hysterical Hare), (d. 2001).

September
 September 22: Ken Southworth, English animator (Walt Disney Company, MGM, Walter Lantz, Hanna-Barbera, Filmation, Clokey Productions, Warner Bros. Animation), (d. 2007).
 September 28: Arnold Stang, American actor (voice of the title character in Top Cat), (d. 2009).

October
 October 27: Jacques Eggermont, Belgian comics artist and animator (worked for CBA), (d. 1998).
 October 31: Carmen D'Avino, American painter, sculptor and film director, (d. 2004).

November
 November 5: Alan Tilvern, English actor (portrayed R.K. Maroon in Who Framed Roger Rabbit, voice of Innkeeper in The Lord of the Rings), (d. 2003).
 November 11: 
 Howard Purcell, American comics artist, writer and animator, (d. 1981).
 Seymour Reit, aka Sy Reit, American animator (Fleischer Studios, co-creator of Casper the Friendly Ghost), writer, screenwriter, comics writer and comics artist, (d. 2001).
 November 30: Efrem Zimbalist Jr., American actor (voice of Alfred Pennyworth in the DC Animated Universe, Dr. Octopus in Spider-Man, Justin Hammer in Iron Man), (d. 2014).

December
 December 31: Virginia Davis, American actress (portrayed Alice in Walt Disney's Alice Comedies), (d. 2009).

Deaths

January
 January 9: Emile Reynaud, French inventor and animation pioneer (inventor of the praxinoscope responsible for the first projected animated films), dies at age 73.

References

External links 
Animated works of the year, listed in the IMDb